Gebre (Gäbrä) is a common masculine Ethiopian and Eritrean name, meaning "servant" in Ge'ez. It is used as both a stand-alone given name and, frequently, as a prefix (or stem) in religiously themed compound names; e.g. Gebreselassie ("Servant of the Trinity"), Gebremeskel ("Servant of the Cross"), or Gebremariam ("Servant of Mary"). Gebru is a variant, often seen in Tigrinya.

As with other such compound names, when written in transliteration in a Latin script, it is often abbreviated as "G/" (e.g. G/Selassie for Gebreselassie). It may likewise also be transliterated with a hyphen or a space connecting it to the root, potentially obscuring the nature of the name.

List of people named Gebre or variant 
Afevork Ghevre Jesus (1868–1947), Ethiopian writer, wrote the first novel in Amharic
Ghebreselassie Yoseph ( late 20th century), Minister of Finance of Eritrea from February 1997 to 2001
Bogaletch Gebre (born July 27, 195x, exact year unknown), Ethiopian women's-rights activist
Eleni Gabre-Madhin or Eleni Zaude Gabre-Madhin, Ethiopian economist, chief executive officer of the Ethiopia Commodity Exchange (ECX)
Gabra Manfas Qeddus, Ethiopian Christian saint, founder of the monastery of Zuqualla
Gebregziabher Gebremariam (born 1984), Ethiopian long-distance runner
Aleqa Gebre Hanna ( late 19th century), debtera of the Ethiopian Church
Gebre Krestos ( 1830s), Emperor of Ethiopia
Gebre Kristos Desta (1932–1981), Ethiopian modern artist
Gebre Mesqel Lalibela, king of Ethiopia
Girma Bekele Gebre (born 1992), Ethiopian runner
Haile Gebrselassie (born 1973), Ethiopian athlete
Sebhat Gebre-Egziabher (1936–2012), Ethiopian writer
Tedros Adhanom Ghebreyesus (born 1965), Ethiopian politician, academic, and public-health authority, Director-General of the World Health Organization since 2017
Tesfaye Gebre Kidan (1935–2004), Ethiopian general and politician
Tewolde Berhan Gebre Egziabher (born 1940), Ethiopian scientist
Tewolde-Medhin Gebre-Medhin (1860–1930), Eritrean pastor, educator and translator
Theodor Gebre Selassie (born 1986), Czech footballer
Timnit Gebru (born 1983), Ethiopian computer scientist
Tsegaye Gabre-Medhin or Tsegaye Gebre-Medhin (1936–2006), Ethiopian poet, playwright and essayist
Mesay Gebre Makebo (born 1991), Ethiopian Hotel and Hospitality Professional

See also 
Gebre Guracha, town in central Ethiopia
Gebroek
Gibret
Jebres

Amharic-language names